A pentachord in music theory may be either of two things. In pitch-class set theory, a pentachord is defined as any five pitch classes, regarded as an unordered collection . In other contexts, a pentachord may be any consecutive five-note section of a diatonic scale . A pentad is a five-note chord .

Under the latter definition, a diatonic scale comprises five non-transpositionally equivalent pentachords rather than seven because the Ionian and Mixolydian pentachords and the Dorian and Aeolian pentachords are intervallically identical (CDEFG=GABCD; DEFGA=ABCDE).

The name "pentachord" was also given to a musical instrument, now in disuse, built to the specifications of Sir Edward Walpole. It was demonstrated by Karl Friedrich Abel at his first public concert in London, on 5 April 1759, when it was described as "newly invented" . In the dedication to Walpole of his cello sonatas op. 3, the cellist/composer James Cervetto praised the pentachord, declaring: "I know not a more fit Instrument to Accompany the Voice" . Performances on the instrument are documented as late as 1783, after which it seems to have fallen out of use. It appears to have been similar to a five-string violoncello .

References

Further reading
 

Chords
Pentatonic scales
Simultaneities (music)